Keedy may refer to:

 Keedy House, historic home in Boonsboro, Maryland

People with the surname 

 Cornelius L. Keedy (1834–1911), American pastor, physician, and academic administrator
 Edwin R. Keedy (1880–1958), American legal scholar and academic administrator 
 Gary Keedy (born 1974), English bowler
 Jeffery Keedy (born 1957), American graphic designer, writer, educator
 Pat Keedy (born 1958), American baseball player
 Keedy (born 1965), American singer-songwriter

See also 

 Keddy (disambiguation)
 Kiddie (disambiguation)